Terrell Grice is an American producer, singer-songwriter, and YouTuber. He is best known as the host of the variety talk show The Terrell Show, where he has interviewed guests including The Clark Sisters, Jade Novah, Lalah Hathaway, and Amber Riley. His channel has approximately 1,000,000 subscribers as of November 2021.

Early life and education 
Grice was born and raised in the small town of Mullins, South Carolina. He moved to North Carolina with his mother when he was 14. Grice was raised a devout Christian and attended church regularly, where he also sang in the choir. He was not allowed to listen to secular music and grew up listening to gospel artists like Helen Baylor, Shirley Caesar, and the Winans. Grice began listening to R&B music during high school when a friend played Brandy's Have You Ever?.

He was a serious tennis player from age 11 and traveled regularly for games. He was undefeated until he sustained a shoulder injury as a high school junior. After having to stop playing tennis, Grice took a class about television that developed his interest in the entertainment industry. He went on to receive his bachelor's degree in film making from Full Sail University.

Career 
Grice moved to Los Angeles after college and worked in television production as a casting assistant for programs including The Voice and Showtime at the Apollo. He credits the experience with teaching him skills in interviewing.

In December 2017, Grice started a YouTube channel with reaction videos to television singing competitions The Voice and The Four. He continued to gain followers and began using his one-bedroom apartment to interview guests for a web series that he named The Terrell Show. The guests are singers, producers, and actors, many who are up-and-coming, and the interviews usually feature a game called Song Association. The Source referred to the show as "one of the most comprehensive talent discovery platforms for R&B music." Previous guests include Amber Riley, Durand Bernarr, Cynthia Erivo, Avery Wilson, Lalah Hathaway, The Clark Sisters, PJ Morton, and Todrick Hall. Grice's channel also includes the original singing competition Race to the Blue, which debuted in 2019.

Grice is a singer-songwriter and in 2020 independently released the album An Invitation to the Cookout featuring vocals from several past Terrell Show guests.

He was named to the #YouTubeBlackVoices Creator Class of 2021, and used the funding to move his productions to a professional studio. That year he also launched the cooking series T and Coco with singer and actress Coco Jones.

Grice was a red carpet host for the 62nd Grammy Awards and was also hired as an official host of the 93rd Oscars Virtual Watch Party.

Grice signed with the talent agency CAA in November 2022. He performed in his first professional acting role on season three of The Ms. Pat Show in 2023.

Personal life 
Grice is openly gay. He resides in Los Angeles.

Awards and nominations 
 2022 – NAACP Image Awards, Social Media Personality of the Year, Nominee

References

External links 
 

Year of birth missing (living people)
Living people
21st-century African-American male singers
African-American television producers
American YouTubers
American television talk show hosts
Full Sail University alumni
African-American male singer-songwriters
People from Mullins, South Carolina
Entertainers from South Carolina
Entertainers from North Carolina
LGBT African Americans
American gay musicians
LGBT YouTubers
Singer-songwriters from South Carolina